Hodiya is a moshav in southern Israel. Located near Ashkelon, it falls under the jurisdiction of Hof Ashkelon Regional Council.

History
The moshav was founded in 1949 by immigrants from India. Today most of the residents are immigrants, or descendants of immigrants from Iran and Yemen.

It was built on the lands of the depopulated  Palestinian village of Julis.

References

Indian-Jewish culture in Israel
Iranian-Jewish culture in Israel
Moshavim
Populated places established in 1949
Populated places in Southern District (Israel)
1949 establishments in Israel